Setarchinae, the deep-sea bristly scorpionfishes, is a small subfamily of deep-sea ray-finned fishes, it is part of the family Scorpaenidae.  They are small marine fishes, growing up to 25 cm, and are found in tropical and subtropical waters throughout the world.

Taxonomy
Setarchinae, or the family Setarchidae, were first described as a taxon by the Japanese ichthyologist Kiyomatsu Matsubara in 1943. The grouping is treated as a subfamily of the Scorpaenidae within the order Scorpaeniformes by the 5th Edition of Fishes of the World. However, other authorities, such as FishBase, regard the taxon as a family within the suborder Scorpaenoidei, part of the Perciformes. The name of the subfamily comes from Setarches which was described by the English zoologist James Yate Johnson in 1862 but Johnson did not explain what the name alluded to, it may be derived from saeta meaning "bristle".

Genera
The following four genera are classified within the subfamily Setarchinae, and the combined have a total of 11 species.

 Ectreposebastes Garman, 1899
 Lioscorpius Günther, 1880:
 Lythrichthys Jordan & Starks, 1904
 Setarches Johnson, 1862

Lithrchthys was previously regarded as a synonym of Setarches but has been treated as a valid genus by Catalog of Fishes with Setarches being considered to be a monotypic genus containing solely S. guentheri.

Characteristics
Setarchinae species are differentiated from related species by the possession of a highly modified lateral line, reduced ossification and a reduction in the head's ability to be moved, supination. The lateral line is lacking in scales and consists of a single trough and the scales on the body are small and cycloid. In adults there are no suborbital spines. They have a small, sharp nasal spine and the parietal bone is low, ending at its rear end with a spine or spinule. In large specimens many spines are absent and in smaller specimens there are some spines around the eye but in larger individuals only the postocular spine is well defined. The have 12–13, typically 12 spines and 9-11 soft rays in the dorsal fin, the last ray is divided close to its base. The anal fin has 2-3 spines and 4-6 soft rays, the last ray being divided.

Distribution and habitat
Setrachinae are found in the Atlantic, Indian and Pacific Oceans.

References

External links

 
Ray-finned fish families